Andrzej Nadolski (26 November 1921, in Kraków – 24 December 1993, in Łódź) was a Polish historian, specializing in Polish military history, an archaeologist, and professor. During World War II he was a member of Armia Krajowa. Rector of University of Łódź from 1968 to 1969, he resigned in protest over the 1968 Polish political crisis.

Publications 
Studia nad uzbrojeniem polskim w X, XI i XII wieku, 1954
Polskie siły zbrojne w czasach Bolesława Chrobrego. Zarys strategii i taktyki, 1956
Polska broń. Broń biała, 1974
Broń i strój rycerstwa polskiego w Średniowieczu, 1979
Plemięta – średniowieczny gródek w Ziemi Chełmińskiej
Polska technika wojskowa do 1500 roku

1921 births
1993 deaths
Nobility from Kraków
Home Army members
Polish male non-fiction writers
20th-century Polish historians
20th-century Polish archaeologists
Academic staff of the University of Łódź